In computing, an attribute is a specification that defines a property of an object, element, or file. It may also refer to or set the specific value for a given instance of such. For clarity, attributes should more correctly be considered metadata. An attribute is frequently and generally a property of a property. However, in actual usage, the term attribute can and is often treated as equivalent to a property depending on the technology being discussed. An attribute of an object usually consists of a name and a value. For an element these can be a type and class name, while for a file these can be a name and an extension, respectively.

Rules and typing 
 Rules: Each named attribute has an associated set of rules called operations: For example, one doesn't sum characters or manipulate and process an integer array the same way as an image object. Neither does one process text as if it was type of floating point (decimal numbers).
 Data types: It follows that an object definition can be extended by imposing data typing which can consist of a representation format, a default value, and legal operations (rules) and restrictions (e.g. "division by zero is not to be tolerated") are all potentially involved in defining an attribute, or conversely one may view them as attributes of that object's type. 
Picture file formats (for example JPEG, PNG and BMP) are not decoded using the same operations (however similar the images look — these are all graphics data formats). Similarly, a programming language does not use the same operations to evaluate a floating point typed number and typed long integers.

For example, in computer graphics, line objects can have attributes such as thickness (with real values), color (with descriptive values such as brown or green or values defined in a certain color model, such as RGB), dashing attributes, etc. A circle object can be defined in similar attributes plus an origin and radius.
In reference to computer systems, attributes are defined particularly for read or write attributes for specific read or write.

Attribute usage
If the element in question could be considered a property (CUSTOMER_NAME) of another entity (let's say CUSTOMER), the element can have zero or more attributes (properties) of its own (CUSTOMER_NAME is of TYPE = "KINDOFTEXT").

C#
In the C# programming language, attributes are metadata attached to a field or a block of code like assemblies, members and types, and are equivalent to annotations in Java. Attributes are accessible to both the compiler and programmatically through reflection.

Users of the language see many examples where attributes are used to address cross-cutting concerns and other mechanistic or platform uses. This creates the false impression that this is their sole intended purpose.

Their specific use as metadata is left to the developer and can cover a wide range of types of information about any given application, classes and members that is not instance-specific. The decision to expose any given attribute as a property is also left to the developer as is the decision to use them as part of a larger application framework.

They are often used by the CLR services, like COM interoperability, remoting, serialisation and can be queried at runtime.

The example shows how attributes are defined in C#:

[Obsolete("Use class C1 instead", IsError = true)]  // causes compiler message saying
public class C {...}                                // that C is obsolete

public class ObsoleteAttribute: Attribute {         // class name ends with "Attribute"
  public string Message{ get; }                     // but can be used as "Obsolete"
  public bool IsError{ get; set; }
  public ObsoleteAttribute() {...}
  public ObsoleteAttribute(string msg) {...}
  public ObsoleteAttribute(string msg, bool error) {...}}

[Obsolete]
[Obsolete("This is obsolete")]
[Obsolete("This is obsolete", false)]
[Obsolete("This is obsolete", IsError = false)]

Positional parameters like first parameter of type string above are parameters of the attribute's constructor. Name parameters like the Boolean parameter in the example are a property of the attribute and should be a constant value.

Attributes should be contrasted against XML documentation that also defines metadata, but is not included in the compiled assembly and therefore cannot be accessed programmatically.

HTML & JavaScript
Display the checked attribute and property of a checkbox as it changes.

<!doctype html>
<html lang="en">
<head>
<body>
<input name="food" type="meal" id="meal">
  <meta charset="utf-8">
  <title>attr demo</title>
  <style>
  p { border;1px solid black;
font-family; arial, sans-serif;
text-align center;
  }
  b {
    color: blue;
  }
  </style>
  <script src="https://code.jquery.com/jquery-1.10.2.js"></script>
</head>
<body>
 
<input id="check1" type="checkbox" checked="checked">
<label for="check1">Check me</label>
<p></p>
 
<script>
$( "input" )
  .change(function() {
    var $input = $( this );
    $( "p" ).html( ".attr( 'checked' ): <b>" + $input.attr( "checked" ) + "</b><br>" +
      ".prop( 'checked' ): <b>" + $input.prop( "checked" ) + "</b><br>" +
      ".is( ':checked' ): <b>" + $input.is( ":checked" ) + "</b>" );
  })
  .change();
</script>
</body>
</html>

before click
.attr( 'checked' ): checked
.prop( 'checked' ): false
.is( ':checked' ):  false

after click
.attr( 'checked' ):   checked
.prop( 'checked' ):    true
.is( ':checked' ):     true

Multi-valued databases
On many post-relational or multi-valued databases systems, relative to SQL, tables are files, rows are items, and columns are attributes. Both in the database and code, attribute is synonymous with property and variable although attributes can be further defined to contain values and subvalues.

The first of these databases was the Pick operating system. Two current platforms include  Rocket U2's Universe and InterSystems’ Caché.

XML
In XML, an attribute is a markup construct consisting of a name/value pair that exists within a start-tag or empty-element tag. Markup languages, such as HTML and XML, use attributes to describe data and the formatting of data.

A good example is the process of XML assigning values to properties (elements). Note that the element's value is found before the (separate) end tag, not in the element itself. The element itself may have a number of attributes set (NAME = "IAMAPROPERTY").

If the element in question could be considered a property (CUSTOMER_NAME) of another entity (let's say CUSTOMER), the element can have zero or more attributes (properties) of its own (CUSTOMER_NAME is of TYPE = "KINDOFTEXT").

See also
 Attribute–value pair
 File attribute
 Extended file attributes
 Field (computer science)
 Property (programming)
 Java annotation
 Metadata

References

Computer data

sl:Atribut alt
sv:Objektorienterad programmering#Attribut